Raymond Tuputupu is a New Zealand rugby union player who plays for the  in Super Rugby. His playing position is hooker. He was named in the Hurricanes squad for Round 3 of the 2022 Super Rugby Pacific season.

References

New Zealand rugby union players
Living people
Rugby union hookers
Hurricanes (rugby union) players
2003 births